Down Below is the debut studio album by Australian indie rock band The Cruel Sea. Originally released as a 12" EP in September 1989, it was re-released in December 1989 as the band's debut studio album.

The album includes the track "Reckless Eyeballin'" – an instrumental track that later became the theme song of Australian TV police drama, Blue Heelers (1994–2006).

Background and release
The Cruel Sea formed late 1987 by Jim Elliot on drums and Dan Rumour on guitar, and as a purely instrumental outfit. In late 1988, keyboardist James Cruickshank and Ken Gormley on bass were added and in early 1989 singer Tex Perkins joined the band on a part-time basis and added lyrics to the band's melodies. The band signed to Red Eye Records in mid-1989 and released Down Below as a 9-track 12" EP in September 1989. It was re-released in December 1989 with two additional tracks as the band's debut studio album.

Reception
The Canberra Times said, "The band has roped in Tex Perkins (from the Beasts of Bourbon) as singer, and his deep, mournful voice gives the vocal tracks a wonderfully evocative atmosphere. Strong acoustic or semi-acoustic guitar dominates most tracks, with a largely inconspicuous rhythm line and keyboards."

Track listings

Charts

Release history

References

1989 debut albums
EPs by Australian artists
The Cruel Sea (band) albums